Hege Løken (born 31 August 1993) is a Norwegian handball player for Molde Elite.

She is also a part of Norway's recruit team.

References

1993 births
Living people
Norwegian female handball players
Expatriate handball players
Norwegian expatriate sportspeople in Romania
People from Stranda
Sportspeople from Møre og Romsdal
21st-century Norwegian women